Kükürt can refer to:

 Kükürt, Atkaracalar
 Kükürt, Yenipazar